Shanley High School (formerly Sacred Heart Academy), is a Catholic high school located in Fargo, North Dakota and operated by the Diocese of Fargo as part of the John Paul II Catholic Schools Network. As of 2014, it served approximately 314 students. Academics are strongly oriented towards college preparatory with approximately 99% of the student body continuing to either a 2 or 4-year degree program. In addition to standard academics courses, student complete required religious education courses during each academic semester.

History
In 1882, a group of Presentation Sisters from Ireland, immigrated to Fargo, North Dakota and opened St. Joseph's Academy, the first Catholic school in Fargo. In 1897, the school was renamed Sacred Heart Academy and moved into a new building on North Broadway. Sacred Heart originally provided primary and secondary education. After the 1950 academic year, the school moved to a new building, and was renamed Shanley High School in honor of John Shanley, the first bishop of Fargo. Less than a decade after opening, the school was severely damaged by the 1957 Fargo tornado, an F5 tornado that destroyed much of north Fargo.

Starting in 1964, the De LaSalle Christian Brothers began involvement with the school, acting as both administrators and teachers. Christian Brothers and Presentation Sisters would continue to work in the school until 1989.

In 2001, construction began on the joint Shanley High School and Sullivan Middle School building. This $13.9 million project moved the school from its original location in north Fargo to an 80-acre site in south Fargo shared with Sts. Anne & Joachim Catholic Church. The final academic year in the original building completed in May 2002.

In the fall of 2010, Shanley High School completed construction and expansion of existing activities facilities along with the creation of a multi-purpose football and soccer field named "Sid Cichy Stadium" in honor of one of the program's former coaches. The project includes plans for a baseball field as well as track and field facilities.

In 2019, a Shanley bus driver, Bruce Arnold, was arrested and given a DUI by the Fargo Police. The police were given a report of a bus being driven erratically. Police followed the bus, which was on the route from Trinity School after the school day, into the parking lot of the Shanley-Sullivan campus. The police confirmed that there were minors board and Bruce Arnold had blood alcohol content of .12.

Activities

Athletics
Throughout the 1950s to 1970s, Shanley's football team rose to prominence under head coach Sid Cichy. Throughout his tenure (1948-1977) the team won 16 state titles and completed 11 undefeated seasons. At one time the Deacons held the record for longest consecutive unbeaten streak in the country, having won 59 games in a row.

In 2009, Shanley was reclassed to "AA", the second level of North Dakota's four-class football system.
Shanley also has shown its ability to produce NFL talent as of late.

North Dakota State Championships

Choral department
Shanley is home to a large choral program with two choirs, the Concert Chorale and the Varsity Choir, both directed by Patrick McGuire. Members of the choir are also able to participate in numerous music festivals and competitions. In the fall of 2005, Shanley's Concert Chorale was given the designation of "Governor's Choir" for the state of North Dakota.

Notable alumni

Rick Helling - Major League Baseball player
Roger Maris - Major League Baseball player
M. Elizabeth Magill, legal scholar, currently Provost for the University of Virginia, previously Dean of Stanford Law School
Connor McGovern - National Football League player
Dan Arnold (American football) - National Football League Player

Notes

References

External links

Shanley High School website

Roman Catholic Diocese of Fargo
Catholic secondary schools in North Dakota
Educational institutions established in 1889
Education in Fargo–Moorhead
North Dakota High School Activities Association (Class A)
North Dakota High School Activities Association (Class AAA Football)
Schools in Cass County, North Dakota
Buildings and structures in Fargo, North Dakota
1889 establishments in Dakota Territory